HMS Cattistock, the third ship of this name, is a  of the Royal Navy. She was launched in 1981 and commissioned on 5 March 1982, the third ship of her class.

Operational history
In 1991, she was placed under the command of Sir George Zambellas, who was First Sea Lord from 2013 until 2016.

In July 1997 she suffered an engine room fire and was under repair at Rosyth Dockyard for 14 months. In September 1999 she replaced the minehunter  in the NATO Mine Countermeasures Force North West Europe.

She was mentioned in the media in December 2002 after colliding with a jetty as she was leaving her homeport of HMNB Portsmouth in late November. She was left with a 2-foot hole in her side, although no crew were hurt in the collision. It was the third such collision that year: the submarine  ran aground off the Isle of Skye earlier in November and the destroyer  hit rocks off the coast of Australia in July.

In 2012 she assisted in the location of two Royal Air Force Panavia Tornados which had crashed in the Moray Firth.

From early February 2013 Cattistock led Standing NATO Mine Countermeasures Group 2, in a four-month deployment to the Mediterranean, conducting maritime security operations and providing force protection, and also taking part in a multinational mine hunting exercise (MINEX 13–1) off the coast of Spain in April, before eventually returning to her home port in early May.

In October 2013 she took part in Exercise Joint Warrior. She took part in further training programmes in February 2014, and in April was engaged in survey operations in the approaches to the Clyde Estuary.

In 2014–2015 Cattistock received a major upgrade, including two new Caterpillar C32 diesel engines, at BAE Systems, Portsmouth, eventually returning to active service in November 2015 after 18 months.

In November 2017 Cattistock destroyed a WWII-era  bomb which had been discovered 50 miles off the coast of Norfolk close to a major North Sea gas pipeline.

In early January 2018, she sailed from Portsmouth to join the Standing NATO Mine Countermeasures Group 1 (SNMCMG1) as part of a deployment to the Baltic. She carried out various operations, including a search around Oslo, in which ten mines and torpedoes dating back to WWII were found. Cattistock finally returned home after four months in mid-April.

Affiliates
HMS Cattistock is affiliated with the following:
 Cattistock, Dorset
 Cattistock Hunt
 Trinity School CCF
 TS Comus - Wallsend Sea Cadets
 TS Onslow - Oldham Sea Cadets
 Lilliput Sea Scouts, Poole

References

External links

 

Hunt-class mine countermeasures vessels
1981 ships